Government House is the former official residence of the lieutenant governors of Alberta. Located in Edmonton's Glenora neighbourhood, since 1964 the restored and repurposed building has been used by the Alberta provincial government for ceremonial events, conferences, and some official meetings of the caucus.

The City of Edmonton maintains the Government House Park, part of the North Saskatchewan River valley parks system, in the river valley directly below the Government House clifftop location. Government House is about a  walk from the Alberta Legislature Building, northwest along the banks of the North Saskatchewan River.

The Royal Alberta Museum was housed in a separate building on the same property from 1967 until 2018.

Official viceregal residence (1913–1938)
The property for the house, with a large surrounding area, was purchased by the Province of Alberta in 1910. Construction on the building, intended from the outset to house the lieutenant governor, began in 1912, and the official opening was held on October 7, 1913. The three-storey building is constructed of sandstone in the Jacobean Revival style.

It was used as the viceregal residence until 1938. When it was closed, the Alberta Government cited economic concerns, as well as the closing of the Ontario Government House the year previous, as reasons for the closure. However, the closure also came soon after Lieutenant Governor John C. Bowen refused to grant royal assent to three controversial bills passed through the Legislative Assembly, and was, along with the removal of his support staff and official car, seen as an act of retaliation by Premier William Aberhart.  The building was sold, and the furniture and fixtures were sold.

General use (1938–1964)
The building was used a boarding house for American pilots flying supplies up to the Alaska Highway and then was acquired by the federal government as military hospital during the Second World War. After the war the building was used as convalescent home for veterans.  The house and grounds were returned to the provincial Crown in 1964.

Government House (1964 onwards)
When the building was returned to the provincial Crown, the Government of Alberta extensively restored and reopened as conference centre for government use. The grounds were also chosen as the site of the new Alberta Provincial Museum, which was built as a Canadian Centennial project by the Canadian and Alberta governments and opened in 1967 to celebrate Canada's 100th anniversary of Confederation. The museum was renamed the Royal Alberta Museum in 2005, an honour from Queen Elizabeth II, who visited Alberta that year as part of the province's celebration of its own 100th anniversary as a province.

Government House has since hosted many important functions, including visits by Pope John-Paul II, Queen Elizabeth II and visits by other members of the Canadian Royal Family. Visiting foreign dignitaries are greeted at the ceremonial porte-cochere. These dignitaries, including the Royal Family, reside at a hotel, normally the Hotel Macdonald, when visiting the provincial capital.

Government House has reception rooms, conference rooms and support facilities. While it is no longer the viceregal residence, it is here that the lieutenant governor presides over swearing-in ceremonies for Cabinet ministers. Every Thursday while the legislature is in session, the caucus of the governing party meets in the Alberta Room, a 100-seat conference room on the top floor.

When not in use for official purposes, members of the public can take tours of the building at no cost. On display are artifacts and original pieces of furniture from the building's time as a residence and information is also provided about the building's restoration and current functions.

Alberta Viceregal residences (1938–2005)
From 1938 until 2005, Alberta owned and operated an official residence, a separate office, and provided an entertaining venue for the viceroy. The lieutenant governor lived in a Crown-owned house in the Glenora district of Edmonton (a single storey bungalow at 58 St Georges Crescent), while holding an office at the Legislature Building, where royal assent is granted and where the lieutenant governor received the premier.

The house in Glenora was demolished in 2005 and, as of 2008, there was still no official residence for the lieutenant governor; at that time, Lieutenant Governor Norman Kwong resided at another house near this demolished house.

New official residence
In April 2011, it was announced that a new Royal Alberta Museum would be built in Downtown Edmonton.

Then Premier Stelmach and the Alberta government stated that the site of the old museum, on the grounds of Government House, would be used to build a new official residence for the lieutenant governor.

See also
Government Houses of Canada
Government Houses of the British Empire
Monarchy in Alberta
Lieutenant Governor of Alberta
List of Lieutenant Governors of Alberta

References

External links

 (Federal Historic Sites and Monuments Act Designation)
 - (Provincial Historical Resources Act Designation)

Houses completed in 1913
Government buildings completed in 1913
Convention centres in Canada
Alberta government buildings
Provincial Historic Resources in Edmonton
Alberta
Houses in Alberta
Defunct hospitals in Canada
Hospitals in Edmonton
Veterans' hospitals
Tudor Revival architecture in Canada
Jacobethan architecture
Veterans' homes
National Historic Sites in Alberta
1913 establishments in Alberta
Buildings and structures on the National Historic Sites of Canada register